Aurick or Aurik is a masculine Germanic name, meaning protecting ruler or noble leader.
Its feminine form is Aurika. It is a variant of Adalric.

Notes and references 

German masculine given names